Baren (known as Baren Pop up) is the sixth season of the reality The Bar in Sweden. Presenter of the show is Paolo Roberto.

Season 6
Name: Baren Pop-Up
Start Date: 13 April 2015
End Date: 
Duration: ?? days
TV: TV12

Contestants

Nominations

 The contestants on Team A.
 The contestants on Team B.

Notes
 : The contestants were divided into 2 teams: A (Aina, André, Fredrik & Gurkan) & B (Ellinor, Jessica, Rodney & Sandra). The Team A won more money in the Bar, and they had to evict someone from Team B.
 <small>: Felicia as a new contestant is Immune she had to divide the contestants in 2 new teams: A (André, Ellinor, Felicia & Gurkan) & B (Aina, Fredrik, Jessica & Sandra). A team won again and yesterday the first +/- was held. Only the members from the A team could be voted as + and members from B team as -

External links
Official web.

Mass media in Sweden